This is a list of French tariffs.

1806: Continental System
1860: Cobden–Chevalier Treaty
1881: French tariff of 1881
1885: French tariff of 1885
1887: French tariff of 1887
1892: Méline tariff
1968: European Economic Community (Common External Tariff completed 1 July)

Tariffs
Foreign trade of France